George White's Scandals  is a 1945 American film starring Joan Davis, Jack Haley, Phillip Terry, and Glenn Tryon. It features Haley's Wizard of Oz co-star Margaret Hamilton. This film included music by Edwin Finckel.

Plot
This Broadway revue is about two love affairs. The romance between the comedian Joan Mason and Jack Evans of Boston is easily disturbed by Jack's cynical sister, Clarabelle Evans, who is against their relationship. The romance between the wealthy British Jill Martin and Tom McGrath, the assistant to Broadway impresario George White, is a love-hate relationship. Gene Krupa  and his band, together with the virtuoso organist Ethel Smith, keep both couples dancing a lot.

Cast

 Joan Davis as Joan Mason
 Jack Haley as Jack Evans
 Phillip Terry as Tom McGrath
 Margaret Hamilton as Clarabelle Evans
 Glenn Tryon as George White
 Sam Ash as Nightclub Manager
 Rose Murphy as Hilda (Joan's maid)
 Jane Greer as Billie Randall (Billed as Bettyjane Greer)

References

External links
 
 
 
 

1945 films
1945 musical films
American black-and-white films
RKO Pictures films
Films directed by Felix E. Feist
American musical films
1940s English-language films
1940s American films